The 2007 Eastern Illinois Panthers football team represented  Eastern Illinois University as a member of the Ohio Valley Conference (OVC) during the 2007 NCAA Division I FCS football season. The team was led by 20th-year head coach Bob Spoo and played their home games at O'Brien Field in Charleston, Illinois. The Panthers finished the season with an 8–4 record overall and a 7–1 record in conference play. The team received an at-large bid to the NCAA Division I Football Championship playoffs, where they lost to Southern Illinois in the first round. Eastern Illinois was ranked No. 18 in The Sports Network's postseason ranking of NCAA Division I FCS teams.

Schedule

References

Eastern Illinois
Eastern Illinois Panthers football seasons
Eastern Illinois Panthers football